True to the Navy is a 1930 romantic comedy film directed by Frank Tuttle for Paramount Pictures. The film stars Clara Bow as a counter girl at a San Diego drugstore with a predilection for sailors. Eventually she sets her sights on Bull's Eye McCoy (Fredric March), a stiff-necked gunner's mate.

Cast
Clara Bow as Ruby Nolan
Fredric March as "Bull's-Eye" McCoy
Harry Green as Solomon Bimberg
Sam Hardy as Brady
Rex Bell as Eddie
Ray Cooke as Peewee
Eddie Fetherston as Michael
Eddie Dunn as Albert
Adele Windsor as Maizie
Harry Sweet as Artie

Critical reception
Allmovie wrote, "the spectacle of distinguished actor Frederic March in sailor togs, chewing gum and dispensing sez-you dialogue, is worth the admission price in itself" ; while The New York Times noted, "it is a moderately deserting Summer-weather film, which succeeded in eliciting a good deal of laughter at its showing yesterday."

References

External links

Paramount Pictures films
1930s English-language films
Films directed by Frank Tuttle
Films set in San Diego
American black-and-white films
1930 romantic comedy films
Films about the United States Navy
American romantic comedy films
Films with screenplays by Herman J. Mankiewicz
1930s American films